Declassified is an American television series produced by Ten Worlds Productions on The History Channel that originally aired on November 9, 2004. The series takes viewers inside vaults and archives around the world to reveal the untold stories of modern history. With the fall of the Iron Curtain and the advent of market economies worldwide, new footage and materials are flooding out of formerly secret organizations like East Germany's Stasi, the Kremlin, the U.S. Central Intelligence Agency, and state television in Korea. Declassified reveals the stories behind the previously unseen footage with relentless, fast-cut montage and a rock beat. Declassified fuses modern graphics and editing, story-telling, rock music (from Blackie Lawless of W.A.S.P.) and expert interviews to bring to light the thrilling and secret tales of our modern era.

The show's director Kosh, winner of three Grammy Awards, is the former creative director for Apple Records and designer for the Beatles and Eagles. Produced and created by Susan Shearer, John J. Flynn and Kosh. Executive produced by Carl Lindahl for the History Channel.

Episodes

See also
 Freedom of Information Act
 Classified information

External links

2000s American documentary television series
2004 American television series debuts
2006 American television series endings
Documentary television series about war
History (American TV channel) original programming